Shanieka Ricketts (born 2 February 1992) is a Jamaican athlete whose specialty is the triple jump. She won the silver medal at the 2019 World Championships in Doha. Her personal bests in the event are 14.98 metres outdoors (Doha, 2021) and 14.08 metres indoors (Albuquerque 2013). In July 2021, she qualified to represent Jamaica at the 2020 Summer Olympics.

Competition record

References

External links

1992 births
Living people
Jamaican female triple jumpers
World Athletics Championships athletes for Jamaica
Athletes (track and field) at the 2014 Commonwealth Games
Athletes (track and field) at the 2018 Commonwealth Games
Athletes (track and field) at the 2015 Pan American Games
Athletes (track and field) at the 2019 Pan American Games
Pan American Games silver medalists for Jamaica
Pan American Games medalists in athletics (track and field)
People from Saint Thomas Parish, Jamaica
Athletes (track and field) at the 2016 Summer Olympics
Olympic athletes of Jamaica
Commonwealth Games medallists in athletics
Commonwealth Games silver medallists for Jamaica
World Athletics Championships medalists
Diamond League winners
Jamaican Athletics Championships winners
Medalists at the 2019 Pan American Games
Athletes (track and field) at the 2020 Summer Olympics
20th-century Jamaican women
21st-century Jamaican women
Athletes (track and field) at the 2022 Commonwealth Games
Commonwealth Games gold medallists for Jamaica
Medallists at the 2018 Commonwealth Games
Medallists at the 2022 Commonwealth Games